The South Australian Company, also referred to as the South Australia Company, was formed in London on 9 October 1835, after the South Australia (Foundation) Act 1834 had established the new British Province of South Australia, with the South Australian Colonization Commission set up to oversee implementation of the Act.

The South Australian Company was a commercial enterprise, and not officially connected to the British Government or the Colonization Commission, but turned out to be indispensable in allowing emigration to the new colony to begin. The founding board of the company, headed by George Fife Angas, consisted of wealthy British merchants, with the purpose of developing a new settlement in South Australia, building a new colony by meeting an essential financial obligations of the South Australia Act 1834. It bought up unsold land to the level required by the Act for emigration to be allowed to begin.

During the first years of settlement, the company built a great deal of infrastructure and contributed to the creation of industries such as fishing and mining, and it continued to play an important part in the business affairs of the colony (and later state) of South Australia for over a hundred years. It ended business in its own right on 17 March 1949, when it was liquidated by Elders Trustee & Executor Company Ltd. Many streets in Adelaide were named after men associated with the company.

Background
The South Australian Association (1833–1834) had lobbied the British Government for years to set up a new colony in southern Australia. The members of the Association were men of varied backgrounds, from philanthropists to merchants, including Edward Gibbon Wakefield, Robert Gouger, Robert Torrens Sr and George Fife Angas. The association underwent numerous negotiations and submitted and resubmitted many plans, until the British Parliament finally gave approval and passed the South Australia Act 1834 on 15 August 1834. The association's original plan was for the colony to be more or less independent, but the government thought otherwise; a governor would represent the Crown (British Government), and would share administration of the new colony with the London-based South Australian Colonization Commission, which would be represented in the colony by a resident commissioner, surveyor-general, and various other officers. The new Act also required that a certain amount of land had to be sold in the colony before anybody was allowed to emigrate.

History of the company

Foundation
George Fife Angas, after resigning from the association, offered to set up a company to buy up the remaining unsold land, which was agreed by the Colonisation Commissioners, so long as this new company, the South Australian Company, did not attempt to set up monopolies in the colony.

The founding Board of Directors of the South Australian Company, established on 9 October 1835, were Angas as Chairman; Raikes Currie; Charles Hindley MP; James Hyde; Henry Kingscote; John Pirie, Alderman; Christopher Rawson; John Rundle MP; Thomas Smith; James Ruddell Todd; and Henry Waymouth; with Edmund John Wheeler (Manager); Samuel Stephens, (Colonial Manager); and Edward Hill (Secretary pro tem).

The original purpose of the company was to help prospective colonists meet the obligations set out in the South Australia Act 1834. The United Kingdom did not want the "province" to be a financial burden, like other colonies, and imposed certain conditions through the Act. One of these conditions was the sale of real property (land) to the value of £35,000. Each director was required to buy at least £2,500 in shares in the company. Research published in 2018 and 2019 concluded that these sales and the creation of company, which secured the establishment of South Australia, link the colony's creation with slavery in the British West Indies.

It was this purchase of land that enabled emigration to commence. It was purely a commercial venture, but without it, the colonisation plan would not have come to fruition.

First Fleet of South Australia (1836)
 
After a historic meeting at Exeter Hall on 30 June 1834, where the principles, objects, plan and prospects of the new Colony of South Australia were explained to the public, hundreds of enquiries from prospective emigrants arrived at the South Australian Association's headquarters in London.

In January 1836 four ships sailed from England on behalf of the company, ahead of the Colonisation Commission's planned expedition. They developed a settlement at Kingscote on Kangaroo Island, in July 1836, but when farming proved unviable, both the settlement and the company's operations were moved to the mainland. The company provided basic infrastructure for the new colony and sold or leased land to immigrants who came to settle.

Over the course of six months, nine ships, which may be termed the First Fleet of South Australia, arrived in the new colony:

Post-settlement
During the first years of settlement, the company undertook the construction of a great deal of infrastructure: roads, bridges, mills, wharfs and warehouses. It contributed to the creation of the whaling, fishing and shipbuilding industries and encouraged mineral exploration. There was, however, a financial slump, or Depression, in the 1840s, and company dividends were unable to be paid out until 1848, after copper was discovered at Burra.

The company continued to be an important part of the business affairs of Adelaide and the colony (later state) for over a hundred years.

From 1872, the South Australian Company occupied offices on North Terrace on the corner of Gawler Place. The new building, "Gawler Chambers", was completed in 1914.

It was wound up on 17 March 1949, with the management of its remaining business transferred to Elders Trustee & Executor Company Ltd.

Lists of people

Colonial Managers
The Colonial Managers of the South Australian Company were:

Officers of the company
Most of the major streets in the Adelaide city centre were named after the founding directors of the company

Chairmen
1836–1848 George Fife Angas (1789–1879)  (Angas Street)
1848–18?? James Ruddell Todd
1886–1888 Sir John Rose
1889–1897 Charles Gay Roberts
1898–1898 Godfrey Webb
1899–1923 Henry Joslin 

Directors
1836–18?? Raikes Currie (Currie Street)
1836–18?? Charles Hindley (Hindley Street)
1836–18?? James Hyde
1836–18?? Henry Kingscote
1836–18?? John Pirie (Pirie Street)
1836–18?? Christopher Rawson
1836–18?? John Rundle (Rundle Street)
1836–18?? Thomas Smith
1836–18?? James Ruddell Todd
1836–1848 Henry Waymouth (Waymouth Street; died 23 January 1848)
1880–1911 Major General Sir Stanley De A.C. Clarke, G.C.V.O., C.M.G.
1889–1919 Sir John H. Kennaway, Bart. C.B., M.P.
1891–1922 Andrew Johnston 
1895–1931 John Henry Grant 
1899–1931 Sir R.H. Hermon Hodge (later Lord Wyfold) 
Joseph Fisher
Robert Barr Smith
Tom Elder Barr Smith

Company Secretaries
1878–1911 James Hutchison 
1911–1930+ Henry Brandreth Gibbs F.C.I.S.

Attorneys in South Australia
William Bartley 
1850–1906 Sir Samuel Davenport, K.C.M.G.
1876–1923 John Warren Bakewell 

Local Board of Advice, Adelaide
1841–1885 William Bartley 
1841–18?? Edward Stephens
1856–1870 William Bakewell, M.P., Crown Solicitor 
1876–1923 John Warren Bakewell 
1886-1930+ Joseph Fisher
1894–1932 Sir John Lancelot Stirling K.C.M.G., M.L.C.

Accountants
Edward Stephens
Edward Robert Simpson (died 11 July 1900)

Others associated with the company
Most of the major streets in the Adelaide city centre were named after the founding directors of the company. Naming of the settlements streets was completed on 23 May 1837 and gazetted on 3 June by the Street Naming Committee (Adelaide).

See also
British colonisation of South Australia

Colonial Land and Emigration Commission
History of South Australia

References

Further reading

Pearse, Malcolm, Australia's Early Managers Australia Pacific Economic and Business History Conference, Wellington, New Zealand, February 2010. p. 12
Price, A. Grenfell, Founders & Pioneers of South Australia, Adelaide, 1929
 Photo of a South Australian Company promissory note for sixpence, issue Kingscote, 1 June 1836, signed by Samuel Stephens, first Colonial Manager of the company.

Sutherland, George, The South Australian Company; a study in colonisation, London; New York: Longmans, Green, 1898.

 
Business services companies established in 1835
Companies disestablished in 1949
1835 establishments in England
1949 disestablishments in Australia
British companies established in 1835